Patrick G. M. Le Quément (born 4 February 1945 in Marseille) is a retired French car designer, formerly chief designer of Renault.
Born in France but brought up in the United Kingdom, Le Quément holds a BA Hons. degree in Product Design from Birmingham Institute of Art and Design, and an MBA from Danbury Park Management Centre.

Le Quément joined Simca of France in 1966 after graduation, but left and set up his own design business which failed. He returned to England and joined Ford in 1968 as a designer.  Here his signature products included the Ford Cargo truck, and 1982's seminal Ford Sierra, ridiculed at the time for its jelly mould shape. The latter car was designed at Ford's engineering and research centre in Cologne-Merkenich, Germany. Promised promotion, he went to Detroit but returned to Europe in June 1985 when Carl Hahn, Chairman of the Volkswagen Group, invited him to set up a centre for Advance Design and Strategy.

In light of poor and declining sales, Renault then-chairman and CEO Raymond Levy recruited le Quément on a hunch that French design could jump-start the company. But before he took the job as vice president, corporate design in 1987, le Quément demanded structural changes in the role of design at Renault, telling Levy: his department would no longer answer to engineering; outside consultants were removed; the design team was doubled to more than 350 people; the department took a seat on the executive board; and personally, le Quément answered to no one but the chairman.
His team's products since have included Twingo, Mégane and Mégane II – which he later admitted in an interview with Automotive News Europe magazine, was too much of a bold design; Scénic; the Espace models of 1994 and 1998; Kangoo; Laguna models of 1994; Avantime and the Vel Satis of 2002.

Le Quément's motto is Design = Quality, and says his structural changes of Renault design were to develop an independent and innovative formal language: "Up to just a few years ago, I would have given you the name of individual products – but today I would be more inclined to say Renault Design. So basically we have abandoned what I call 'styling esperanto', namely the formal language used by most other manufacturers".

In 1987 Le Quément was appointed Senior Vice President of Quality and Corporate Design in 1995, when he also joined the Renault Management Committee. He is the head of Joint Design Policy Group formed by Renault-Nissan design body, since it was founded in 1999. Louis Schweitzer asked him to analyse the design organisation of Nissan in 1999. Le Quément advised establishment of a head designer position, divorced from industrial tasks. Carlos Ghosn, in charge of Nissan, asked Le Quément to draw up a shortlist of designers for this position. Shiro Nakamura was Le Quément's favourite and became head designer at Nissan.

In 2002 he was the winner of the Lucky Strike Designer Award, and he sits on the board of the Europa Academy for Automotive Excellence.

Then, Ghosn, CEO of Renault Group, asked Le Quément to prepare his retirement from Renault, advising his successor. Laurens van den Acker was then hired at Renault. On 10 April 2009, Le Quément announced his retirement in October 2009. He was replaced at Renault by Laurens van den Acker.

References

External links
Official Renault Bio in French and English
Interview re concept of "Fluence"
Citation re winning the Lucky Strike Designer Award

1945 births
Living people
Businesspeople from Marseille
French automobile designers
Ford designers
Renault people
Alumni of Anglia Ruskin University
Alumni of the Birmingham School of Art